Assassination Classroom is an anime series adapted from Yūsei Matsui's manga series of the same name. Produced by Lerche and directed by Seiji Kishi, the first season was broadcast in Japan on Fuji TV from January 9 to June 19, 2015. The series is licensed in North America by Funimation, who simulcast the subtitled version as it aired and streamed an English dub version from February 18, 2015. Adult Swim's Toonami programming block began broadcasting Funimation's English dub of the series on August 30, 2020.

The ending theme is "Hello, shooting star" by Moumoon.


Episode list

Home Media release

Japanese
Avex Pictures has released the series on Blu-ray and DVD, in a limited edition, in Japan from March 27, 2015 to October 28, 2016.

English
Funimation has released the series on Blu-ray and DVD in North America, in a regular and a limited edition, since May 17, 2016.

Notes

References

2015 Japanese television seasons
Assassination Classroom